The women's javelin throw at the 2013 World Championships in Athletics was held at the Luzhniki Stadium on 16–18 August.

Throwing at home, defending champion and world leader Mariya Abakumova made one attempt in the trials.  Her 69.09 flew past the automatic qualifying mark and turned out to be the farthest throw of the competition, leading ten other automatic qualifiers.

In the final, Abakumova couldn't match her qualifier, though she did take the first round lead with 65.09.  But that was to be her best.  In the second round Kimberley Mickle threw a personal best 66.25 to take the lead.  The lead lasted only 5 attempts before Christina Obergföll let loose a 69.05.  That was it, the only other news from the final four rounds was Mickle's second improvement on her personal best to 66.60 in the final round.

Records
Prior to the competition, the records were as follows:

Qualification standards

Schedule

Results

Qualification
Qualification: Qualifying Performance 61.50 (Q) or at least 12 best performers (q) advanced to the final.

Final
The final was started at 16:00.

References

External links
Javelin throw results at IAAF website

Javelin throw
Javelin throw at the World Athletics Championships
2013 in women's athletics